Cheng Ka Ho   is a retired professional wushu taolu athlete and a former captain of the Hong Kong Wushu Team.

Career

Wushu career 
Cheng started practicing wushu at the age of four under his parents and joined the Hong Kong Wushu Team in 1994. He later made his international debut at the 1999 World Wushu Championships and became the first world champion in nangun in addition to winning a bronze medal in nanquan. He was then a triple silver medalist two years later at the 2001 World Wushu Championships. A year later, Cheng won the bronze medal in men's nanquan at the 2002 Asian Games. He then was the world champion in nanquan and won a silver medal in nangun at the 2003 World Wushu Championships. Cheng's last competition was at the 2005 World Wushu Championships where he was the world champion in nangun once again.

Business career 
After his competitive wushu career, Cheng pursued various degrees including a Master of Business Administration at the City University of Hong Kong. He was first hired as a community service director in Hopewell Holdings but now works as a Business Development General Manager with Lee Kee Group.

Honours 

 Hong Kong Sports Stars Awards
 Commendation for Community Service (2007)

See also 

 List of Asian Games medalists in wushu

References 

Living people
Hong Kong wushu practitioners
Wushu practitioners at the 2002 Asian Games
Asian Games bronze medalists for Hong Kong
Asian Games medalists in wushu
Medalists at the 2002 Asian Games
1979 births